The Waiapu Cathedral of Saint John the Evangelist, Napier, is the formal name of the Anglican Cathedral of the Diocese of Waiapu. It is more commonly called either Waiapu Cathedral or Napier Cathedral. The Waiapu cathedral is situated at the north end of the central business district of Napier, New Zealand. Construction of the present building was completed 1965, and the cathedral was consecrated on 8th October 1967. It is built in an Art Deco style.

The church has the unusual distinction of hosting the cathedrae of both the Bishop of Waiapu and of Te Pihopa o Aotearoa/Bishop of Aotearoa (currently Don Tamihere). This is a distinctive aspect of Waiapu Cathedral (differing from St Anne's Cathedral, Belfast, which also serves two dioceses but is the seat of neither).

History

The present-day building replaced an earlier cathedral that was destroyed by the 1931 Hawke's Bay earthquake. Begun in 1886, consecrated in December 1888, and largely complete by 1890, the original cathedral of St John was a brick construction designed by Christchurch architect Benjamin Mountfort. Two lives were lost in the cathedral as a result of the 1931 earthquake. Edith Barry was trapped beneath fallen beams, and was euthanized as flames from the post-earthquake conflagration approached the building. Kate Williams died the following day of injuries sustained in the quake.

Following the total destruction of the first cathedral a temporary building was erected on the site, standing from 1931 until it was closed in 1960.

The current building is widely regarded as a fine example of Art Deco architecture. The design was largely drawn up by Napier architect Kingwell Malcolm, of the firm Malcolm and Sweet, following the untimely death of the selected architect R. S. D. Harman. The stained glass windows were designed by Wellington artist Beverley Shore Bennett.

The previous Dean was The Very Rev'd Dr Michael Godfrey, who was installed by David Rice (bishop) in October 2013. Godfrey was dismissed by Bishop Hedge in May 2016, following allegations that he had committed adultery twenty five years previously. Godfrey did not deny the allegations, but appealed the dismissal, and was reinstated by order of the national Anglican Appeals Tribunal. Bishop Hedge formally apologized to Dr Godfrey and his family but Godfrey elected not to return to the position. Godfrey went on to be Ministry Educator and an archdeacon in the Anglican Diocese of Dunedin.

List of vicars and deans 
(from 1889 the Vicar of Napier was also Dean of Waiapu)
 1859-1863 The Rev'd H. W. St. Hill
 1863      The Rev'd Dr C. J. Abraham Locum tenens while also Bishop of Wellington; see Charles Abraham (bishop of Wellington)  
 1864-1867 The Rev'd Dr L. Saywell
 1867-1877 The Rev'd J. Townsend
 1878-1905 The Very Rev'd de B. Hovell
 1906-1929 The Very Rev'd F. Mayne
 1929-1944 The Very Rev'd J. B. Brocklehurst
 1944-1961 The Very Rev'd O. S. O. Gibson
 1961-1963 The Very Rev'd E. W. R. Guymer
 1964-1973 The Very Rev'd H. A. Childs
 1973-1980 The Very Rev'd B. N. Davis (later Brian Davis (bishop) Bishop of Waikato, Bishop of Wellington, and Archbishop of New Zealand)
 1980-1984 The Very Rev'd Dr D. J. Coles (later David Coles (bishop) Bishop of Christchurch
 1984-1991 The Very Rev'd M. J. Mills (later Murray Mills (bishop) Bishop of Waiapu
 1991-2003 The Very Rev'd N. A. Hendery
 2004-2013 The Very Rev'd Dr H. E. Jacobi (first female dean of a New Zealand cathedral) 
 2013–2017 The Very Rev'd Dr M. J. H. Godfrey 
 2017- 2021 The Very Rev'd I. P. Render
 2022- The Very Rev'd Di Woods

Music team 
Waiapu Cathedral hosts a choir, and one of the finest pipe organs in New Zealand, which has recently undergone a complete restoration. It is the fifth organ on the site, and has received a major re-build by the South Island Organ Company in 2012/3. The organ, featuring more than 3700 pipes, is now the largest church organ in New Zealand. Gary Bowler, who was New Zealand's longest serving Anglican cathedral organist, served as Director of Music from April 1981 to December 2014. Mr James Mist took up the position of Director of Music in July 2015, but left early in 2017.

References

Sources

External links

Buildings and structures in Napier, New Zealand
Napier
1960s architecture in New Zealand